Robert Rufus Bridgers (November 28, 1819 – December 10, 1888) was a Confederate politician during the American Civil War.

Biography
Bridgers was born in Edgecombe County, North Carolina on November 28, 1819. He graduated from the University of North Carolina at Chapel Hill in 1841. He served in the state legislature in 1844, and again from 1858 to 1861.

He married Margaret Elizabeth Johnston on December 12, 1849.

He represented the state in the First Confederate Congress and the Second Confederate Congress from 1862 to 1865.

He died in Columbia, South Carolina on December 10, 1888.

See also

Bridger family of Virginia
Joseph Bridger
Jim Bridger

References

1819 births
1888 deaths
Bridger family
Members of the Confederate House of Representatives from North Carolina
19th-century American politicians
People from Edgecombe County, North Carolina
North Carolina lawyers
Democratic Party members of the North Carolina House of Representatives
University of North Carolina at Chapel Hill alumni
19th-century American lawyers